Glipa uenoi is a species of beetle in the genus Glipa. It was described in 1986.

References

uenoi
Beetles described in 1986